The English national quadball team is the official national quadball team of England. The team, which is organised by QuadballUK, was founded in 2021 after the splitting of Team UK into separate teams for each of the individual home nations. They made their debut at the 2022 IQA European Games in Limerick, winning the tournament.

History 
Previously Team UK represented all the countries of the United Kingdom at international tournaments organised by the International Quadball Association. Team UK was founded in 2012, making their debut at the Summer Games in Oxford. Their final tournament appearance was at the 2019 IQA European Games in Bamberg. In 2021, the decision was made to split Team UK into separate teams for England, Scotland (Team Scotland) and Wales (Team Wales). Players from Northern Ireland compete as part of an all-Ireland team with the Republic of Ireland organised by Quidditch Eire.

Competitive record

2022 European Games 
Team England made their debut at the 2022 European Games held on 22-24 July in Limerick in Ireland, where they placed 1st of 20 teams. The team were placed into group D along with Scotland, Germany, Netherlands and Czech Republic for the group stage on day 1. They finished 2nd in the group below Germany after a 110-140* defeat in their match against them. In the match Germany caught the snitch from behind to even the scores and then went on to score the 3 extra goals required to reach the set score in overtime. During the knockout stage on day 2 they won against Poland, France and then Norway. The final was a rematch against Germany with England winning after catching while 30 points behind then successfully reaching the set score in overtime for a final score of 160*-140.

Players 
The squad for the 2022 IQA European Games was coached by Alice Walker and captained by Luke Twist and consisted of the following players.

See also 

 Quadball
 QuadballUK
 International Quadball Association
 United Kingdom national quidditch team
 Scotland national quadball team

References 

Quidditch national teams
Quidditch
2021 establishments in England
Sports clubs established in 2021